Jawa Dam may refer to:

Jawa Dam, Jordan, the oldest known dam in the world
Jawa Dam, Pakistan, located near Rawalpindi